Rafidah binti Aziz (born 4 November 1943) is a Malaysian politician who was Member of Parliament (MP) for the Selayang from 1978 to 1982 and Kuala Kangsar constituency from 1982 to 2013. Born in Kuala Kangsar, Perak, Rafidah was Minister of International Trade and Industry from 1987 to 2008. As minister, she was the chairman of MATRADE beginning in 1991. She was a veteran politician from United Malays National Organisation (UMNO) of Barisan Nasional (BN) until 2018.

Early career
Rafidah graduated with a Bachelor of Arts degree in Economics in 1966 and a master's degree in Economics in 1970 from the University of Malaya. She then began her career as a tutor and lecturer in the Faculty of Economics, University of Malaya from 1966 to 1976.

Political career
Rafidah was an active member in the Malaysian political scene, having previously been appointed as a Member of the Malaysian Parliament. She was appointed as Senator in 1974 and resigned to contest in the General Elections in 1978. She served as Member of Parliament in the Selayang Constituency (from 1978 to 1982) and Kuala Kangsar Constituency (from 1982 to 2013). She served in the UMNO Supreme Council for 38 years since winning a seat in the council in 1975. She is Malaysia's longest-serving Prime Minister, having served in that capacity from 1987 to 2018. Previously, she also hold the portfolio of Minister of Public Enterprises from 1980 to 1987 and Minister of Finance from 1977 to 1980. In 1976, she was appointed as Parliamentary Secretary in the Ministry of Public Enterprises.
Rafidah was the head of United Malays National Organisation's Woman Wing (Wanita UMNO in Malay) from 1999 to 2009, before losing out in the 2009 UMNO General Assembly election to Shahrizat Abdul Jalil after seeking re-election for another term. She is holding the title of the longest serving woman MP in Malaysia from 1978 to 2013 for 35 years.

In 2006, Rafidah was accused of corruption related to the issuance of Approved Permits (AP) for importing foreign vehicles by former Prime Minister Mahathir Mohamad in his series of criticisms against the Government of Malaysia. Mahathir had also criticised then Prime Minister Abdullah Ahmad Badawi's handling of the Approved Permits (AP) issue, expressing his surprise that Rafidah was still retained as a Cabinet member although two people on the list of persons issued with highest number of APs were linked to her.

In March 2008, following the general election held in that month, Rafidah was dropped from cabinet, despite winning her parliamentary seat when other ministers had lost theirs. After thirty-two years in government service, and twenty years as a minister, she described herself as being "blessed and content." When asked if she was saddened, she said that she wished Prime Minister Abdullah Ahmad Badawi had told her earlier on not to contest the election.

In 2018, she was fired from UMNO ahead of the 2018 general election which saw the failure of the party and BN to maintain the power as a ruling government for the first time in history.

Post political career
Rafidah currently serves as the Non-Executive Independent Chairman and Director of AirAsia X since March 3, 2011. She was also the Chairman of Supermax Corporation Berhad from June 16, 2015 until her resignation on April 16, 2018.

On 5 May 2018, UMNO had announced it had fired three party veterans including Rafidah with Daim Zainuddin and Rais Yatim for supporting the opposition, Pakatan Harapan then. However she claimed she had ceased being a member of UMNO since almost a decade ago.

Rafidah was appointed one of the members Economic Action Council (EAC) by the new PH government on 11 February 2019.

Election results

Awards and recognitions
Rafidah was the main recipient of the Nona Superwoman Award in 2018.

Honours

Honours of Malaysia
  :
  Member of the Order of the Defender of the Realm (AMN) (1973)
  Commander of the Order of the Defender of the Realm (PMN) – Tan Sri (2008)
  :
  Knight Commander of the Order of the Crown of Selangor (DPMS) – Datin Paduka (1979)
  :
  Knight Grand Commander of the Order of the Perak State Crown (SPMP) – Dato’ Seri (1989)
  :
  Knight Grand Commander of the Order of the Crown of Terengganu (SPMT) – Dato’ (1998)
  :
  Knight Commander of the Most Exalted Order of the Star of Sarawak (PNBS) – Dato Sri (2003)
  :
  Grand Commander of the Exalted Order of Malacca (DGSM) – Datuk Seri (2007)

References

1943 births
Living people
People from Perak
People from Kuala Kangsar
Former United Malays National Organisation politicians
Members of the Dewan Rakyat
Women members of the Dewan Rakyat
Members of the Dewan Negara
Women members of the Dewan Negara
Government ministers of Malaysia
Women government ministers of Malaysia
Women in Perak politics
Academic staff of the University of Malaya
University of Malaya alumni
Knights Commander of the Most Exalted Order of the Star of Sarawak
Knights Commander of the Order of the Crown of Selangor
Members of the Order of the Defender of the Realm
Commanders of the Order of the Defender of the Realm
20th-century Malaysian women politicians
20th-century Malaysian politicians
21st-century Malaysian women politicians
Knights Grand Commander of the Order of the Crown of Terengganu